Lublewo Gdańskie is a village in the administrative district of Gmina Kolbudy, within Gdańsk County, Pomeranian Voivodeship, in northern Poland.

For details of the history of the region, see History of Pomerania.

The village has a population of 1512.

Notable residents

 Karl-Heinz Bartsch (1923-2003), German politician

References

Villages in Gdańsk County